Chief Sardar Shahar Yar Khan Shar is a Pakistani politician who has been a member of the Provincial Assembly of Sindh since August 2018.

Political career

He was elected to the Provincial Assembly of Sindh as a candidate of the  Pakistan Tehreek-e-Insaf (PTI) from PS-18 Ghotki-I in the 2018 Pakistani general election.

References

External links
Welcome to the Website of Provincial Assembly of Sindh

Living people
Pakistan Tehreek-e-Insaf MPAs (Sindh)
Year of birth missing (living people)